The University of Madeira (UMa;) is a Portuguese public university, created in 1988 in Funchal, Madeira. The university offers first, second cycle and Doctorate academic degrees in a wide range of fields, in accordance with the Bologna process. It is now under the CMU/Portugal agreement with Carnegie Mellon University, having master programme in Computer Engineering, Human Computer Interaction and Entertainment Technology. Students admitted will be eligible for scholarships and have internship opportunity during the summer break. In addition, Madeira Interactive Technologies Institute, founded in January 2010, is devoted to building international partnership with other educational institutes and industry.

History
The university's campus dates back to a 16th-century Jesuit college. Its first higher education institution, a medical school, was founded in Funchal in the 18th century. In 1978, the University of Lisbon established a satellite campus in Madeira, and from 1983 to 1986, today's campus began taking shape, offering courses in the areas of science and technology, arts, humanities, and social sciences. In 1985, the campus integrated a polytechnic school of nursing (Escola Superior de Enfermagem); in 1989, a polytechnic school of education (Escola Superior de Educação da Madeira). In 1996, the Portuguese government and the University of Lisbon formally established the University of Madeira as an independent institution. In 2008, the university celebrated its 20-year anniversary.

University of Madeira today
Today, undergraduate and graduate students choose from a wide range of programs across several departments, including art and design, biology, Medicine, physical education & sports, English, German studies, romanic studies, physics, management and economics, mathematics and engineering, psychology and humanistic studies, chemistry, and a nursing school. Specific programs include art and multimedia, communication culture and organizations, and the educational sciences.

Student life
The Academic Association of UMa (AAUMA) provides an array of extracurricular activities for university students throughout the year. Past AAUMA sponsored events have included film screenings, Sports Gala, boating trips, and volunteer opportunities. In addition, representatives from each student association serve on the Advisory Council, affording students an active role in the growth of the university and its relationship with the surrounding community.

Students who wish to explore Funchal will find a modern city of about 100,000 inhabitants. Its harbor and climate, combined with an attractive geographical position, have allowed Funchal to have a rapid population growth. The island is noted for its wine production, along with its exotic flowers, tropical fruits, and New Year's Eve celebrations with a spectacular fireworks show, considered the biggest in the world.

Partnership with Carnegie Mellon
In 2007, Madeira's Mathematics and Engineering Department, along with Carnegie Mellon's Human Computer Interaction Institute (HCII) established a dual-degree Master's in Human-Computer Interaction program. In the program, students study computer science, design, psychology, and social and decision sciences. Students enrolled in the partnership program study in Madeira and at Carnegie Mellon's Pittsburgh campus, earning master's degrees from both universities.

Faculties
University of Madeira consists of the following faculties:
 Faculty of Arts and Humanities
 Faculty of Exact Sciences and Engineering
 Faculty of Social Sciences
 Faculty of Life Sciences
 School of Health Sciences
 School of Technology and Management

Specialized units and research projects
In addition to the above-mentioned faculties, UMa consists of several research and specialization units.

Public funded Research Groups
 Chemistry Centre of Madeira
 Madeira Interactive Technologies Institute (M-ITI)
 Molecular Materials Research Group
 Centre for Research in Education

Integrated in Public funded Research Groups
 Centre of Applied Economics Studies of the Atlantic
 Research Centre for Mathematics and Applications
 Research Centre in Sports Science, Health and Human Development
 Research Centre for Health Technology and Services
 Low-Temperature Plasma Physics Research Group

Other Research Groups
 ISOPlexis Genebank
 Research Centre for Regional and Local Studies
 Centre for Portuguese and European Literatures and Cultures
 Astronomy Group at the University of Madeira
 Madeira Botanical Group
 Human Genetics Lab

See also
 List of universities in Portugal
 Higher education in Portugal
 Madeira Interactive Technologies Institute (M-ITI)

References

External links
 

1988 establishments in Portugal
Educational institutions established in 1988
University of Madeira
Buildings and structures in Funchal
Organisations based in Madeira